Lionel Cousens is an Australian Paralympic archer.  He was born in Western Australia. At the 1964 Tokyo Games, he won a silver medal in archery in the Men's St. Nicholas Round Team open event.

References

Paralympic archers of Australia
Australian male archers
Archers at the 1964 Summer Paralympics
Medalists at the 1964 Summer Paralympics
Wheelchair category Paralympic competitors
Paralympic silver medalists for Australia
Paralympic medalists in archery
Sportsmen from Western Australia
Year of birth missing (living people)
Living people